Agnès Maltais (born November 7, 1956) is a Canadian politician from Quebec. She was a Member of the National Assembly of Quebec for the riding of Taschereau in the Quebec City region. She represented the Parti Québécois.

Maltais mostly worked in the theatrical sector being a development agent for Video-Femmes and the director of the Periscope and the la Bordée theaters. She was also a member of the Conseil québécois de théâtre. She was a political activist since 1976 when she obtained a diploma at the Cégep de Sainte-Foy. She was a spokesperson for the YES committee in the 1995 referendum and was involved in the organization of the Fête Nationale concerts and shows in 1991 and 1995.

Maltais was first elected in Taschereau in 1998 and became the Minister of Culture and Communications from 1998 to 2001. She was then named the Delegate Minister of Health, Social Services and Youth protection and Delegate Minister of Employment. Re-elected in 2003, she was the President of the Opposition Caucus. After 9 years in Opposition, the PQ formed a slim minority government after the 2012 election. Maltais immediately entered Cabinet as Minister of Labour, Employment, and Social Solidarity and Minister responsible for the status of women. In this portfolio, she presided over controversial changes to the social assistance system in Quebec, that put the PQ government in conflict with some anti-poverty groups. Maltais was also critical of changes to the EI system announced by the federal Conservative government in Ottawa.

Long identified with the left-wing of the Parti Quebecois, Maltais has been elected 6 times in the inner-city riding of Taschereau in Quebec City. While the riding had been a safe seat for the PQ, it has become much more marginal in recent years as the PQ has become increasingly less and less competitive in the Capital Region. In 2014, Maltais only held onto the riding by 400 votes over her Liberal challenger and hers was the only PQ held seat in the region. She did not run for re-election in 2018.

In 2003, Ms. Maltais became the first openly lesbian member of the National Assembly, when she came out to an audience at Laval University. In 2006, she participated in the International Conference on LGBT Human Rights.

Electoral record

References

External links
 

1956 births
Canadian LGBT people in provincial and territorial legislatures
Women government ministers of Canada
French Quebecers
Lesbian politicians
Living people
Members of the Executive Council of Quebec
Parti Québécois MNAs
Women MNAs in Quebec
People from Côte-Nord
Politicians from Quebec City
21st-century Canadian politicians
21st-century Canadian women politicians
21st-century Canadian LGBT people